In Response is the third and final studio album by Philadelphia post-hardcore band This Day Forward.

Track listing
 White Picket Defense System (3:22) 
Composed by: Frangicetto, This Day Forward 
 One and One (4:01)  
Composed by: Frangicetto, This Day Forward 
 The Breath  (4:36)  
Composed by: Frangicetto, Shaw, This Day Forward 
 In the Past ... On the Ground (4:13)  
Composed by: Frangicetto, Shaw, This Day Forward 
 Euphio Question (2:18) 
Composed by: Shaw, This Day Forward
 Fragile Version (4:18)  
Composed by: Frangicetto, This Day Forward 
 The Red Room (2:16)
Composed by Shaw, This Day Forward  
 Abandon the Abbreviated World (3:42) 
Composed by: Frangicetto, Shaw, This Day Forward 
 Nouveau (4:18)  
Composed by: Frangicetto, This Day Forward  
 Voice (5:09)
Composed by: Frangicetto, Shaw, This Day Forward 
 Seven (3:51)  
Composed by: This Day Forward 
Performed by: Vadim Taver

Musicians who played on the album
Brendan Ekstrom - Guitar
Colin Frangicetto - Drums
Gary Shaw - Bass
Mike Shaw - Vocals
Vadim Taver - Guitar, Wurlitzer, Vocals

2003 albums
This Day Forward albums
Equal Vision Records albums